The Catholic Church in Serbia is part of the worldwide Catholic Church, under the spiritual leadership of the Pope in Rome. There are 356,957 Catholics in Serbia according to the 2011 census, which is roughly 5% of the population. Catholics are mostly concentrated in several municipalities in northern Vojvodina, and are mostly members of ethnic minorities, such as Hungarians and Croats.

History
The first official Concordat between the former Kingdom of Serbia and the Holy See was concluded on 24 June 1914. Through the Second Article of Concordat, it was decided that the regular Archdiocese of Belgrade should be created. Because of the outbreak of the First World War, those provisions could not be implemented, and only after the war were new arrangements made.

In 1918, Serbia became part of the newly formed Kingdom of Yugoslavia. By 1924, the Archdiocese of Belgrade was officially created and the first Archbishop appointed. Negotiations on a new Concordat between the Kingdom and the Holy See were led by the Yugoslav Minister of Justice Ljudevit Auer and Cardinal Eugenio Pacelli (who later become Pope Pius XII). The Concordat was signed in 1935, but was never officially ratified because of a political crisis in Yugoslavia (1936-1937).

Hierarchy
Within Serbia, the Latin Rite Catholic hierarchy consists of one archdiocese, three dioceses and one apostolic administration.

In addition, the Greek Catholic Eparchy of Ruski Krstur was established in 2002 for Eastern Catholics of the Byzantine Rite in Serbia and Montenegro. In 2013, jurisdiction of the Eparchy was reduced to Serbia only.

The Diocese of Srijem is a suffragan of the Archdiocese of Đakovo-Osijek in Croatia. Since 2000, Kosovo is under the Diocese of Prizren-Pristina, which also covers some Albanian-populated parts of southern Serbia.

Statistics

Bishops' Conference of St. Cyril and Methodius

The International Bishops' Conference of Saints Cyril and Methodius is the International Catholic Episcopal Conference that includes Serbia, Kosovo, Montenegro and Macedonia. Permanent members are the Catholic bishops and archbishops from the four countries. Two bishops are authorized (Apostolic Exarchate) for jurisdictional districts of the Byzantine rite. As of 2012, the Chairman of the Conference is the Archbishop of Bar Zef Gashi. The conference is a member of the Council of European Bishops' Conferences.

Notes

Further reading

External links

 Conference of the Saints Cyril and Methodius
 Catholic Archdiocese of Belgrade
 Radio Maria of Serbia

References

 
Serbia
Serbia